Karielys Cuadros Rodríguez is a Venezuelan beauty pageant titleholder. She competed at Miss Venezuela Mundo 2015 held on July 4 where she landed as First Runner-Up.

Personal life
Karielys was born in Maracay, Aragua state, but at a very young age moved to Cantaura, Anzoátegui state, where she received primary and secondary education. Currently she is studying Public Accounting in the Universidad de Oriente. Karielys is a clarinetist and pianist of system orchestras of Venezuela.

Fairs of Cantaura
Karielys competed in the Queen of the Fair of Cantaura 2014 (Reina de las Ferias de Cantaura 2014), which resulted in her winning the title.

Miss Venezuela Mundo 2015
 Karielys competed in the 7th edition of Miss Venezuela Mundo 2015 and placed First Runner-Up.

References 

  A Karielys Cuadros le salió una doliente in Diario 2001
  Aquí están los chismes calientes, calientes de la semana in El Tiempo on July 20, 2015
  Así marcha el miss Venezuela mundo 2015 in El Siglo on July 2, 2015
  Candidatas se enfrentaron por primera vez al jurado in Últimas Noticias on June 30, 2015
  Doce bellezas para el mundo in El Universal on June 24, 2015
  Karielys quiere la corona del Miss Venezuela Mundo in El Tiempo on June 2, 2015
  Nunca quise inspirar lástima in La Verdad on July 7, 2015
  Dos bellezas aragüeñas que compiten por la corona de Miss Venezuela Mundo 2015 in El Periodiquito on June 22, 2015

Living people
Miss Venezuela
Venezuelan beauty pageant winners
1995 births